Guillaume Ballu (27 May 1885, Gournay-sur-Marne – 11 May 1968) was a French politician. He belonged to the Democratic Republican Alliance and joined the Democratic and Social Action from 1928 to 1932 and the Republican Centre from 1932 to 1936. He was a member of the Chamber of Deputies from 1928 to 1936.

References

1885 births
1968 deaths
People from Seine-Saint-Denis
Politicians from Île-de-France
Democratic Republican Alliance politicians
Democratic and Social Action politicians
Republican Centre politicians
Members of the 14th Chamber of Deputies of the French Third Republic
Members of the 15th Chamber of Deputies of the French Third Republic
French military personnel of World War I
Chevaliers of the Légion d'honneur